Vyšný Komárnik is a village and municipality in Svidník District in the Prešov Region of north-eastern Slovakia, in the Laborec Highlands.

History
In historical records the village was first mentioned in 1600.

During World War II, Vyšný Komárnik was the first liberated village on the territory of (then) Czechoslovakia.

In 1949, the Czechoslovak government erected a memorial and cemetery southeast of the Dukla border crossing, It contains the graves of several hundred Russian and Czechoslovak soldiers. Several other memorials and cemeteries have also been erected in the region.

Geography
The municipality lies at an altitude of 440 metres and covers an area of 6.000 km². It has a population of about 79 people. It is also lying near the Dukla Pass, as well as near international border crossing with Poland.

References

External links
 

Villages and municipalities in Svidník District
Šariš